St. Joseph's Catholic Church, also known as St. Joseph, Camp Springs and St. Joseph in the Hills, is a rural  Roman Catholic parish near Camp Springs in Campbell County, Kentucky. The historic parish church and cemetery are located at 6833 Four Mile Road. The parochial school was located on the adjacent plot at 6829 Four Mile Road. It remains an active parish in the Roman Catholic Diocese of Covington, and its cemetery is still open for the burial of parish members.

History

Catholic priests had visited the area as early as 1844. Martin Spalding, Bishop of Louisville, himself came to Four Mile Creek in August 1853 and was instrumental in the founding of the parish. By 1858, there were 109 registered families, mostly German immigrants. In 1868, the parish school moved into its own stone building, though this was later replaced with a modern structure, and by 2015, the school had closed except for its preschool programs due to declining enrollment.

Church

The church is situated on a promontory that overlooks the valley. Completed in 1865, it is a belfried brick structure with a low gabled roof. It is notable for the rich iconography of its interior decor, including altarpieces and murals, mostly installed under the pastorship of Fr. Woestehen, parish priest from 1909 to 1926. Stained glass windows were contributed by members of the church from 1910 to 1912, and plaster and molding work were also installed in 1912. In the 1920s, the church's murals were painted by Leon Lippert, a student of noted Covington artist Frank Duveneck. The statue of Our Lady of Sorrows was donated in 1926 by Emma Ritter, and marble work in the sanctuary was completed by Bert Moriconi and painted in the 1940s.

On May 16, 1983, the church and cemetery were added to the National Register of Historic Places.

References

External links
 Official parish site
 St. Joseph Camp Springs Pre-Kindergarten
 
 

German-American culture in Kentucky
Roman Catholic churches in Kentucky
Churches on the National Register of Historic Places in Kentucky
Roman Catholic cemeteries in the United States
Cemeteries on the National Register of Historic Places in Kentucky
Churches in Campbell County, Kentucky
Roman Catholic churches completed in 1864
Religious organizations established in 1845
National Register of Historic Places in Campbell County, Kentucky
19th-century Roman Catholic church buildings in the United States
1864 establishments in Kentucky
Roman Catholic Diocese of Covington